Brother's Keeper was an American metalcore band from Erie, Pennsylvania.

History 
Formed in 1994 by members of a number of other local bands, Brother's Keeper became the backbone of the Erie hardcore punk and metalcore scene. Alongside bands like xDISCIPLEx A.D., Digression and Neverfall, they created a local community of youth bonded by a common musical interest. Brother's Keeper's sound stood out due to the unique vocal style of Mike Ski.

The band released five CDs as well as a number of 7" records. From 1996 through their breakup in 2003, they were signed to Trustkill Records, although in early 2001 they appeared on the various artists compilation It's All About The Money, co-released by Schauffele's own label Surprise Attack Records, Goodfellow Records and Redstar Records.

Releases 
EPs
 Shadowcast (7") – 1994
 Ladder (7") – 1995
 Self-Fulfilling Prophecy (Trustkill Records 7")
 Sweet Revenge (7"/CS)
 Five Hits From Hell (Ides Of March Records)

Studio albums
 The Continuum (Trustkill Records) – 1996
 ForeverNeverEnding (Trustkill Records)
 Oxymoron (Trustkill Records 12"/MCD)
 Fantasy Killer (Trustkill Records) – 2001

Members 

Last known lineup
 Mike Ski – Vocals (1994–2003)
 Scott Emhoff – Guitars (1994–2003)
 Eric "EMS" Schauffele – Bass (1995–2003)

Former
 Roger Hurlburt – Guitars (1994–1997)
 Chris Bazan – Guitars (1997–2001)
 Mike Peters – Guitars (2001–2002)
 Nate Black – Bass (1995)
 Jason Hoderny – Drums (1994)
 Bob Williams – Drums (1994–1997)
 Zach Hudock – Drums (1998–2001)
 Rich Cali – Drums (2001)
 Ben Lythberg – Drums (2002)

References 

Metalcore musical groups from Pennsylvania
Musical groups from Pennsylvania
Musical groups established in 1994
Musical groups disestablished in 2003
1994 establishments in Pennsylvania
Trustkill Records artists
Good Life Recordings artists